The following is a list of All-Ireland Senior Hurling Championship matches in which Waterford has competed from the 1989 Championship to present.

County hurling team records and statistics
Records and statistics